The Botswana Postal Services Workers' Union (BOPSWU) is a trade union affiliate of the Botswana Federation of Trade Unions in Botswana.

References

Botswana Federation of Trade Unions
Postal trade unions
Organisations based in Gaborone
Trade unions in Botswana